The Daytona Finale was a sports car race held at the infield road course of the Daytona International Speedway in Daytona Beach, Florida.  The race was held from 1972 until 1986, and again in 1996, by the IMSA GT Championship. The race was revived in 2001 by the Grand American Road Racing Association.

Results

External links
Ultimate Racing History: Daytona archive
Racing Sports Cars: Daytona archive
World Sports Racing Prototypes: IMSA archive

Motorsport in Daytona Beach, Florida
IMSA GT Championship races
Grand-Am races
Recurring events disestablished in 2003
Recurring sporting events established in 1972
1972 establishments in Florida
2003 disestablishments in Florida